Nicolás de Pierola Avenue, popularly known as La Colmena, is an avenue located in the Historic Centre of Lima, Peru. It is the southern limit of the area called Damero de Pizarro. It was founded in the year 1900.

History
Its journey from west to east covers 17 blocks. It was named in honor of former President Nicolás de Piérola since it was in 1898 during his government that this road was inaugurated as part of the works to modernize the layout of the city. For much of the 20th century it was an aristocratic street in the city, which is still reflected in its republican-style buildings that resemble Avenida de Mayo in Buenos Aires. However, during the 1980s, it deteriorated, falling prey to crime and prostitution.

Route

On the 10th block of the avenue is the premises of the National Jury of Elections. Opposite said premises was a building that housed the Bank of the Nation and that had to be demolished in 2004 because it was set on fire during the Four Quarters March in July 2000. Currently, a plaza known as Democracy Plaza extends on said land.

Gallery

See also
Historic Centre of Lima

References

Nicolás de Piérola
National University of San Marcos